Hatyara is a 1998 Indian Hindi-language crime film directed by T. L. V. Prasad, starring Mithun Chakraborty(in dual role), Suman Ranganathan, It marked actress Swathi's Bollywood film debut.

Plot
Professor Kajal witnessed a rape and murder of a girl student of her college. She complains to the police but they are reluctant to take any action against the rapist because he is the brother of a powerful and influential gangster, Singhania. Kajal was the wife of advocate Mahendra who is handicapped. Mahendra fights for justice for the girl in court as his wife is the only witness of the rape. Sinhangia asked Kajal to withdraw the case, but Kajal refuses. Angry, Singhania along with his goons rape and kill her in front of helpless Mahendra. Without having any evidence, Mahendra does not prove the offence. Suddenly he saw a young man Surya(also, who looks like him and proposed to him to help him to avenge his wife's death. Surya was actually Mahendra's younger brother. Surya believed that their father made Surya an orphan. Initially, he does not agree with the proposal of Mahendra, but after considering the situation of Mahendra's baby he accepted the proposal. The two brothers started killing the Singhania gang one by one, finally, they also succeeded to kill Singhania. At the end, after killing Singhania Mahendra handover his daughter to suman to take care of her and Surya and Mahender both get surrendered to the police for the crime which was done by them.

Cast
Mithun Chakraborty as Advocate Mahendra / Surya(Double Role)
Suman Ranganathan as Suman
Ann Alexia Anra as Baby Anne
Swathi as Prof. Kajal
Rami Reddy as Shishupal Singhania
Mukesh Rishi as Singhania
Anil Dhawan		
Paintal as Pandey
Kishore Anand Bhanushali

Soundtrack
"Gore Gore Galo Wali" - Abhijeet, Poornima
"Chick Lampo Lalaji" - Udit Narayan, Kavita Krishnamurthy
"O Sanam Tu Le Kasam" - Kumar Sanu, Sapna Mukherjee
"Laal Batti Ke" - Kumar Sanu
"Main Ladki Aur Ladka Tum" - Poornima
"Aaja Main Seekha Doon" - Lalit Sen, Shweta Shetty

References

External links

Hatyara (1998) on TV Guide

1990s Hindi-language films
Mithun's Dream Factory films
Films shot in Ooty
Films scored by Dilip Sen-Sameer Sen
Indian crime action films
1998 action films